Medinipur Lok Sabha constituency (formerly, Midnapore Lok Sabha constituency) is one of the 543 parliamentary constituencies in India. The constituency centres on Midnapore in West Bengal. Six of the seven assembly segments of No. 34 Medinipur Lok Sabha constituency are in Paschim Medinipur district and one is in Purba Medinipur district.

Vidhan Sabha segments

As per order of the Delimitation Commission issued in 2006 in respect of the delimitation of constituencies in the West Bengal, parliamentary constituency no. 34 Medinipur is composed of the following segments:

Prior to delimitation, Midnapore Lok Sabha constituency was composed of the following assembly segments:Patashpur (assembly constituency no. 215), Midnapore (assembly constituency no. 223), Kharagpur Town (assembly constituency no. 224), Kharagpur Rural (assembly constituency no. 225), Keshiari (ST) (assembly constituency no. 226), Narayangarh (assembly constituency no. 227) and
Dantan (assembly constituency no. 228)

Members of Lok Sabha

Election results

General election 2019

General election 2014

General election 2009

General election 2004

General election 1999

By-election 2001
A by-election was held in this constituency in 2001 which was necessitated by the death of sitting MP Indrajit Gupta. In the by-election, Prabodh Panda of Communist Party of India defeated his nearest rival Manorajnan Dutta of Trinamool Congress.

General election 1998

General election 1996

General election 1991

General elections 1951-2004
Most of the contests were multi-cornered. However, only winners and runners-up are generally mentioned below:

 In 1951 Midnapore-Jhargram constituency and in 1957 Midnapur constituency, both the constituencies had two seats, with one seat reserved for Scheduled Tribes. The results here are shown separately.

See also
 Paschim Medinipur district
 List of Constituencies of the Lok Sabha

References

External links
Medinipur lok sabha  constituency election 2019 result details

Lok Sabha constituencies in West Bengal
Politics of Paschim Medinipur district